Thai Town could refer to:
 Thai Town, Los Angeles
 Thai Town, Sydney